Automatic terminal information service, or ATIS, is a continuous broadcast of recorded aeronautical information in busier terminal areas, i.e. airports and their immediate surroundings. ATIS broadcasts contain essential information, such as current weather information, active runways, available approaches, and any other information required by the pilots, such as important NOTAMs. Pilots usually listen to an available ATIS broadcast before contacting the local control unit, which reduces the controllers' workload and relieves frequency congestion.

In the US, ATIS will include (in this order): the airport or facility name; a phonetic letter code; time of the latest weather observation in UTC time; weather information consisting of wind direction and velocity, visibility, obstructions to vision, sky condition, temperature, dew point, altimeter setting, density altitude advisory if appropriate; and other pertinent remarks, including runway in use.  If it exists, the weather observation includes remarks of lightning, cumulonimbus, and towering cumulus clouds.  Additionally, ATIS may contain Man-Portable Air Defense Systems (MANPADS) alert and advisory, reported unauthorized laser illumination events, instrument or visual approaches in use, departure runways, taxiway closures, new or temporary changes to runway length, runway condition and codes, other optional information, and advisories.

The recording is updated in fixed intervals or when there is a significant change in the information, e.g. a change in the active runway. It is given a letter designation (e.g. bravo) from the ICAO spelling alphabet. The letter progresses through the alphabet with every update and starts at alpha after a break in service of 12 hours or more. When contacting the local control unit, pilots indicate their information <letter>, where <letter> is the ATIS identification letter of the ATIS transmission the pilot received. This helps the ATC controller verify that the pilot has all current information.

Many airports also employ the use of Data-link ATIS (D-ATIS). D-ATIS is a text-based, digitally transmitted version of the ATIS audio broadcast. It is accessed via a data link service such as the ACARS and displayed on an electronic display in the aircraft. D-ATIS is incorporated on the aircraft as part of its electronic system, such as an EFB or an FMS. D-ATIS may be incorporated into the core ATIS system, or be realized as a separate system with a data interface between voice ATIS and D-ATIS.

Sample messages

Example at a General Aviation airport in the UK (Gloucestershire Airport)

International Airport Example 1

See METAR for a more in-depth explanation of aviation weather messages and terminology.

Example 2
This example was recorded on 11 July 2016 at London Stansted Airport during which time there were ongoing maintenance works taking place on the taxiway surface in a part of the airport near the cargo terminal; the ATIS broadcast reflects this.

See also
 METAR
 Air traffic control
 Automated airport weather station

References

External links
 Canada ATIS frequencies
 UK ATIS frequencies
 Sydney Australia live web-based ATIS
 EUROCONTROL > ATM Performance > EATM > ACARS > Overview	 
 Digital Automatic Terminal Information Service (D-ATIS) by ARINC Digital Automatic Terminal Information Service
 SkyVector: Flight Planning Abbreviated U.S. airport pop-up ATIS information

Air traffic control
Airport infrastructure